Winogradskyella poriferorum is a Gram-negative and rod-shaped bacterium from the genus of Winogradskyella which has been isolated from the surface of the sponge Lissodendoryx isodictyalis from the Bahamas.

References

External links
 microbewiki

Flavobacteria
Bacteria described in 2005